Darren Murphy is a former Australian rules footballer, who played for the Fitzroy Football Club in the Victorian Football League (VFL).

Career
Murphy played four games for Fitzroy in the 1985 season.

References

External links

1964 births
Living people
Fitzroy Football Club players
Australian players of Australian rules football